The Sheep Range is located north of Las Vegas, Nevada in the United States. It is found in both Clark and Lincoln Counties in the Desert National Wildlife Refuge. The Sheep Range lies in a generally north-south direction.

The Great Basin Divide starts an east-west transect at the northeast of the Spring Mountains, with the east-west transect border south being all of the Las Vegas Valley, and a midsection, north perimeter of the watershed for the Las Vegas Wash. The Great Basin Divide transect goes through the south region of the Sheep Range, and the transect ends eastwards at the Utah border, the Clover and Bull Valley Mountains.

The range was named for mountain sheep which roamed there.

Notes

References 

Nevada Atlas & Gazetteer, 2001, pg. 66

Mountain ranges of Nevada
Mountain ranges of Clark County, Nevada
Mountain ranges of Lincoln County, Nevada